Dorien Gray may refer to:

 The Picture of Dorian Gray, an 1891 philosophical novel by writer and playwright Oscar Wilde
 Roger Margason (died 2015), American author who uses the pseudonym of Dorien Grey